was a Japanese–French painter and printmaker born in Tokyo, Japan, who applied Japanese ink techniques to Western style paintings. At the height of his fame in Paris, during the 1920s, he was known for his portraits of nudes using an opalescent white ink with fine black outlines and his pictures of cats. He returned to Japan in 1933, and served as a war artist for the Imperial Japan during World War II. After the war, Foujita returned to France, where he became a French citizen and converted to Christianity. He was buried in The Chapel of our Lady of Peace, which he had helped build and is painted with his frescoes. Since his death, Foujita's work has become increasingly appreciated in Japan.

Early life in Japan 
Immediately after graduating secondary school, Foujita wished to study in France. But Foujita's father consulted with his colleague, the Japanese author
 who suggested he should first study art in Japan. He enrolled at what is now the Tokyo National University of Fine Arts and Music and studied under , who taught western-style painting.

Foujita graduated from art school in 1910, when he was twenty-four years old. His paintings during the period before he moved to France were often signed "Fujita", rather than the francized "Foujita" which he later adopted.

Paris 

A year after his marriage, Foujita moved to Paris in 1913. Tomiko did not come with him. He settled in Montparnasse in Paris, and quickly became part of the art scene there, which was later became known as the School of Paris. He moved into the artists' residences at Bateau-Lavoir, becoming a neighbor of Amedeo Modigliani. He quickly made friends with the Japanese painter , who had many Paris art connections. Eventually, he became friends with Diego Rivera, Pascin, Chaïm Soutine, and Fernand Léger and met Juan Gris, Pablo Picasso and Henri Matisse. He also became close to the dancer Isadora Duncan and her brother Raymond, who were advocating a return to Greek ideals. During this time, Foujita and Kawashima frequently dressed in Greek clothing in public.

When World War I broke out, the art community centered around the Bateau-Lavoir broke up, as many artists went off to fight in the war. Unable to make ends meet in France, Foujita and Kawashima headed to London in January 1916. In London, Isadora Duncan introduced Foujita to her social group, and Foujita joined a Japanese dancing troupe.
Foujita also divorced Tomiko.

Foujita returned to Paris in early 1917. In March, he met Fernande Barrey in the Café de la Rotonde, who had also been a model for Modigliani. Thirteen days later, Foujita and Fernande were married. A few weeks later, Fernande showed the art dealer Georges Chéron some of Foujita's drawings. Chéron went to Foujita's studio and bought all the works he was shown.

He'd prepare a canvas with a white, opalescent background, which he called grand fond blanc and outlined the figures in a fine brush style that sometimes remained visible in the completed picture.
He began to become known for his nudes painted with vibrant white and for his portraits of cats.

After the armistice ending World War I, Foujita achieved immediate success with his show at the Galerie Devambez on 25 November 1918. Two years later he began working with the model Kiki, who later became Man Ray's lover. One of the portraits Reclining Nude with Toile de Jouy, shows her lying naked against an ivory-white background. It was the sensation of Paris at the Salon d'Automne in 1922, selling for more than 8,000 francs (equivalent to about $ today).

In the same year, he became involved with Lucie Badoul, who he called "Youki", the Japanese word for "snow", and she became one of his models. In 1924, He divorced Fernande. By 1925, Foujita became so well known that he received the Legion of Honor from the French government and the Belgian Order of Leopold.

In 1929, Foujita and Youki married. Foujita also found himself in financial trouble. He had been living a luxurious life of celebrity in Paris but he had not been paying taxes since 1925. Now, the tax authorities caught up with him and demanded full payment. Foujita quickly left for Japan with Youki, hoping he might be able to recoup his losses. Foujita's reception in Japan was mixed. The general public packed his first one-man show in Japan and his works sold well, but the critics panned him as a mediocre artist imitating Western style. Foujita returned from Japan returning to France via the United States. He travelled to Hawai'i, San Francisco, and overland to New York. While in New York, he learned about the Wall Street Crash. He once again briefly returned to New York to organize a one-man exhibition at the Paul Reinhardt Gallery, but the show was not successful.

When Foujita returned to Paris in 1930, he was still short on funds, and shared a place with Robert Desnos who he had met in 1928. During this time, Foujita experimented with painting in a more surrealist style. By 1931, Youki and Desnos had become a couple, and Foujita, who continued to have problems with his back taxes and suffered bankruptcy left for South America with Madeleine Lequeux, a former dancer known as Mady Dormans who worked at the Casino de Paris.

Latin America and the United States

Foujita and Madeleine first went to Brazil, staying in Rio de Janeiro for four months. During this time, he met Ismael Nery, who painted Foujita's portrait. From Brazil, Foujita went to Argentina, where he stayed for five months. In Buenos Aires his exhibition was very popular. He then traveled to Bolivia and Peru, afterwards heading to Cuba.

While traveling through Latin America, Foujita's work departed from his usual style He created many works to stay financially afloat on his trip, particularly producing portraits for clients; but his work also began to capture a greater diversity of racial and ethnic color than in France, and also depicted a wider range of social class.

Foujita then traveled to Mexico, arriving in November 1932 and staying seven months. During one week, he visited the artist  at his home in Taxco. Foujita had learned about Kitagawa through an exhibit of his student's works that had traveled through Europe. These were plein aire works, social art inspired by Mexican postrevolutionary educational methods that aimed to make young rural children their environment through observation. Foujita was so impressed that when he had returned to Japan, he had sixty of the canvases brought back for an exhibit there in 1936. After his visit to Mexico, Foujita traveled through the Southwest of the United States, and then went on to San Francisco and Los Angeles, where he continued to exhibit and be treated as a celebrity.

Return to Japan
Foujita sailed from Los Angeles and arrived in Japan in November 1933. He and Madeleine found the transition to Japanese culture difficult. In February 1935, Madeleine went back to Paris, unexpectedly returning a year later. In June 1936, she suddenly died under unclear circumstances. Soon afterwards, Foujita married his fifth wife, .

In 1938, Foujita began working with the Imperial Navy Information Office establishment as a war artist. He and his fellow artist  founded the Army Art Association, representing official war artists, becoming its president. In spite of his connections with Army Art Association, Foujita decided to return to Paris in April 1939.  He and Kimiyo stayed there for slightly more than a year, leaving France and returning to Japan in May 1940 after the German invasion of Belgium.

After returning to Japan, Foujita became the nation's leading war artist, overseeing special exhibits for the military.

Return to France
After World War II, Foujita had a low reputation in Japan, partly due to using his art to serve as propaganda for the Imperial Japanese military and his refusal to confront accusations about his role as a war artist. The American poet Harry Roskolenko tried to support Foujita by putting on an exhibit of his paintings at the Kennedy and Company Galleries in New York, but none of the paintings were sold. Foujita and Roskolenko blamed , who thought Foujita a fascist, imperialist, and expansionist. Foujita put on another show, but was once more labelled a fascist by artists, including Ben Shahn, who organized a demonstration against him. In January 1950, Foujita and Kimiyo went to France.

Foujita moved to Montparnasse, where he began painting street scenes that he called "Paris Landscapes". He briefly became involved with costume design, creating the "Japanese" outfits for the May 1951 performance of Madame Butterfly at La Scala, and did illustrations for a book by  In 1954, Foujita married Kimiyo, and in 1955 he became a French citizen.  Foujita and Kimiyo converted to Catholicism and were baptised in Reims Cathedral on 14 October 1959, with René Lalou, the head of the Mumm Champagne House, and  Françoise Taittinger as his godfather and godmother. Foujita took the Christian name of Léonard. With the help of Lalou's funding, Foujita built a chapel to Our Lady of Peace (also known as the Foujita Chapel, which was completed in 1966.  The eighty-year-old Foujita painted the walls with religious frescoes.

Foujita died of cancer on January 29, 1968, in Zürich, Switzerland. He was first interred in the Chapel he painted, but Kimiyo had his body transferred to the Cimetière de Villiers-le-Bâcle, near her. In 2003, his coffin was reinterred at the Foujita Chapel under the flagstones in the position he originally intended when constructing the chapel.

Legacy and collections
During his lifetime, Foujita's participation as a war artist had led to his work being neglected. After his death, his work received increasing recognition in Japan as an avant-garde artist with an international standing. But his legacy remains problematic. His work in Paris has been seen as opportunistically appealing to Western orientalism, and his war art has been seen as an opportunistic appropriation of European historical art to serve the needs of nationalistic militarism in Japan. Yet, his work has also been described as a synthesis of two very different discourses of art—the Japanese and the European—that transcends both.

Today, Foujita's works can be found in the Artizon Museum and the Museum of Contemporary Art in Tokyo, with more than 100 in the Hirano Masakichi Art Museum in Akita.

References

Citations

Sources
Books

Journals

Online Sources

External links

Foujita: Imperial Japan Meets Bohemian Paris at NYRB. Includes slideshow. Published May 27, 2018 
Tsuguharu Fujita: Brush, Sewing, Cats, and Ladies
Foujita's Cats
 Tsuguharu Foujita (1886-1962)
Tsuguharu Foujita｜WIKIART VISUAL ART ENCYCLOPEDIA

1886 births
1968 deaths
Artists from Tokyo
19th-century French painters
French male painters
20th-century French painters
20th-century French male artists
School of Paris
Japanese emigrants to France
Japanese portrait painters
Japanese printmakers
French Roman Catholics
Japanese Roman Catholics
Converts to Roman Catholicism
French people of Japanese descent
Modern printmakers
Modern painters
Japanese war artists
World War II artists
Tokyo School of Fine Arts alumni
Recipients of the Legion of Honour
20th-century French printmakers
Artists from Tokyo Metropolis
19th-century French male artists